A bioanalytical equivalent (BEQ) is a unit of measure in the field of bioassays. It is used for example in the bioassay CALUX for testing dioxins and dioxin-like compounds.

References

Environmental science
Equivalent units